Lawrence Taylor (born 1959) is a retired American football player.

Lawrence Taylor may also refer to:
Lawrence Coburn Taylor (1920–1942), US Marine Corps aviator
USS Lawrence C. Taylor (DE-415), a John C. Butler-class destroyer escort acquired by the U.S. Navy
Lawrence Eric Taylor (born 1942), American DUI lawyer and author
Lawrence Palmer Taylor (born 1940), United States ambassador to Estonia

See also
Larry Taylor (disambiguation)
Laurie Taylor (disambiguation)

Taylor, Lawrence